Avellaneda Park is a public park in Buenos Aires, Argentina. It is located at the heart of the Parque Avellaneda neighbourhood, which takes its name from the park.

Overview

Nearly 5 km (3 mi) west of colonial Buenos Aires (little more than a hamlet at the time), an extensive plot of land was deeded in 1755 to the Brotherhood of the Holy Charity of Jesus Christ, who established an orphanage and the area's largest herbal remedy plantation. The "Remedy Farm" was purchased by Domingo Olivera in 1828, who maintained the herbal plantation and established the newly independent nation's first agricultural research station there. His son, Eduardo, became a licensed agronomist, a founding member of the influential Sociedad Rural Argentina and organizer of the country's first agricultural exposition, in 1866.

The Olivera family sold the estate to the city of Buenos Aires in 1912 and, under the direction of City Parks Commissioner Charles Thays, the land was inaugurated as Olivera Park in 1914 (Olivera Park was renamed in honor of former President Nicolás Avellaneda later that year). The 50 hectare (125 acre) park was the city's largest continuous green space and in 1916, the city installed its municipal tree farm on the park's western end for landscaping needs throughout Buenos Aires. Educator Antonio Zaccagnini opened a school for disabled children on the park's eastern end in 1925 and in 1930, following the passing of the Director of the Buenos Aires Zoo, Clemente Onelli, the ridable miniature railway he had installed at the zoo for children was relocated to Avellaneda Park.

The widening of Francisco Bilbao Avenue during the 1950s separated an 8 hectare (20 acre) southern section of the park, which was converted for use by Edenor, the public electric utility serving the area. The most dramatic change in the park's dimensions, however, took place after military-appointed Mayor Osvaldo Cacciatore's expropriation of a wide swath along Bilbao Avenue in 1977. The land was slated for the Perito Moreno Freeway, one of eight Cacciatore approved (though only three were built). Opened in 1980, the freeway's toll plaza takes up much of what was the park's southern section. These developments and nationwide economic malaise during the 1980s contributed to the park's decline. The first reversal of this came in 1989, when the former Olivera mansion was reopened as a cultural center, following years of disuse. A descendant of the mansion's namesake family, Enrique Olivera, became Mayor of Buenos Aires following the election of his predecessor, Fernando de la Rúa, to the Argentine Presidency. As Vice-Mayor, Olivera had initiated restoration projects for the ailing park and in July 2000, he reopened the Onelli miniature railway and inaugurated the Remedy Farm Cultural Center, a homage to the land's original use.

See also

 Avellaneda Park Historic Train

External links
Parque Avellaneda 

Parks in Buenos Aires
Urban public parks